Saint Barnabas High School is an American all-girls, private, Roman Catholic high school located in the Woodlawn Heights section of The Bronx, New York. It also borders the southeastern section of the city of Yonkers in neighboring Westchester County.

It is part of the Roman Catholic Archdiocese of New York.

History
Founded in September 1924, the school has been at its current location since 1959. Since its inception, the school was founded and has been operated by the Sisters of Charity. As of September 1, 2015, Saint Barnabas High School became independent of the Saint Barnabas Parish. 

The Saint Barnabas High School Chapel was renovated sometime during the tenure of Msgr. Timothy S. Collins, which was from 1986 to 1994.

Curriculum
The school follows the New York State Department of Education curriculum. Some senior electives include psychology and personal finance.The school is accredited by the Middle States Association of Colleges and Schools.  

A majority of students go on to colleges or universities. 

The class of 2015 amassed nearly $7 million in college scholarships with a 100% graduation rate. As of 2016, the senior class earned over $10 million in scholarship and grants from a vast array of colleges and universities. 

Additionally, the school offers Mercy College credits for various courses.

Performing arts

Film and drama
The school's Film Club was created in 2008. It merged with the existing Drama Club the following year. Together, the Film and Drama Clubs have produced features and short films. Additionally, plays and musicals have been produced by its members.

Music
The school's choir consists of students from all over the St. Barnabas parish. In 2016, it was the only school in the archdiocese to be invited to sing for Pope Francis during the traditional date of the Epiphany, January 6.

Athletics
The school participates in six sports: basketball, golf, soccer, softball, track and field, and volleyball.

Extracurricular activities
The school has a variety of after-school clubs and activities which include: Albanian Club, Cheerleading, Chess, Choir, Dance (Albanian African, Caribbean, Hip-Hop, Indian, Irish and Spanish), Film and Drama, Italian, La Casa Latina, Math, Art & Anime Club, Nubian Pride, Robotics Club, Shakespeare Competition, Student Ambassadors, Student Council, Student Newspaper, Track Yearbook and marching in the Yonkers St. Patrick's Day Parade.

The school also has academic societies, including the National English Honor Society; Virginia Woolf Chapter, Hispanic National Honor Society; NY Luis Ponce DeLeon Chapter and a National Honor Society; Blanid Stewart Chapter.

Notable alumnae
 Eileen Ivers – musician  
 Alice Mayhew – book editor
 Mildred Trouillot – former First Lady of Haiti

Notes and references

External links

 Official website

Gallery

Roman Catholic high schools in the Bronx
Educational institutions established in 1924
Girls' schools in New York City
1924 establishments in New York City